The Minister of Justice and Public Instruction was a ministry in the colonial administration of New South Wales, established in 1873 in the first ministry of Henry Parkes.

Role and responsibilities
Prior to 1873 there were two legal officers in the ministry, Attorney General and the Solicitor General, however there was only one portfolio, the law officers of the crown. The Attorney was the senior law officer and responsible for the work of the Solicitor-General, Crown Solicitors, parliamentary draftsmen, the administration of the courts and supporting officers such as the Sheriff and Coroner. The Solicitor General represented the crown in court, provided legal advice to the government, drafted bills and helped to prepare civil and criminal litigation.

When the Attorney General Edward Butler resigned, the Solicitor General Joseph Innes was promoted to first law officer. Innes was not however replaced as Solicitor General. Instead Parkes created the new ministry of justice and public instruction. The minister assumed responsibility for the administration of the courts, sheriff and coroner, as well as the Council of Education, orphan schools, the public library, Australian Museum and observatory. The first minister George Allen, was a solicitor who had a particular interest in education, having previously served as a commissioner of National education, supported the incorporation of the Sydney Grammar School and having a seat on the Council of Education immediately prior to his appointment as responsible minister.

Prisons remained the responsibility of the Colonial Secretary. In 1880 the ministry was split into the Minister of Justice and the Minister of Public Instruction.

List of Ministers of Justice and Public Instruction

Notes

References

Justice and public instruction
Justice ministers